Anglo-American Relations at the Paris Peace Conference of 1919 is a book by the American historian Seth P. Tillman that highlights the relationships between the United Kingdom and the United States during the Paris Peace Conference of 1919—1920; the work was first published in 1961.

References 

 Max Gunzenhäuser. Die Pariser Friedenskonferenz 1919 und die Friedensverträge 1919–1920. Literaturbericht und Bibliographie : [de]. — Frankfurt/M. : Bernard & Graefe, 1970. — vii, 287 S. — (Schriften der Bibliothek für Zeitgeschichte, Stuttgart: Heft 9).
 Vinson, J. Chal. Anglo-American Relations at the Paris Peace Conference of 1919. By Seth P. Tillman. (Princeton, N. J.: Princeton University Press. 1961. Pp. xiv, 442. $8.50.) // The American Historical Review. — 1962. — July (vol. 67, iss. 4). — ISSN 1937-5239. — DOI:10.1086/ahr/67.4.991.
 Richard H. Ullman. Anglo-American Relations at the Paris Peace Conference of 1919. Seth P. Tillman // The Journal of Modern History. — 1962. — June (vol. 34, iss. 2). — P. 222–223. — ISSN 0022-2801. — DOI:10.1086/239097.
 J. a. S. Grenville. Seth P. Tillman Anglo-American Relations at the Peace Conference of 1919 (Princeton: Princeton University Press, 1961: London O. U. P., 68s., pp. xiv, 442.)  // Bulletin of the British Association for American Studies. — 1962. — December (vol. 5). — P. 99–100. — ISSN 0524-5001. — DOI:10.1017/S0524500100002230.
 Arthur Willert. SETH P. TILLMAN. Anglo-American Relations at the Paris Peace Conference of 1919. Pp. xiv, 442. Princeton, N. J.: Princeton University Press, 1961. $8.50 // The Annals of the American Academy of Political and Social Science. — 1962. — March (vol. 340, iss. 1). — P. 130. — ISSN 0002-7162. — DOI:10.1177/000271626234000119.
 M. G. Fry. Anglo-American Relations at the Paris Peace Conference of 1919 by Seth P. Tillman (review) // The Canadian Historical Review. — 1964. — March (vol. 45, iss. 1). — P. 66–67. — ISSN 1710-1093.
 G. Bernard Noble. Review of Anglo-American Relations at the Paris Peace Conference of 1919 // The Journal of Southern History. — 1962. — February (vol. 28, iss. 1). — P. 113–115. — DOI:10.2307/2205550.
 Fred H. Winkler. Review of Anglo-American Relations at the Paris Peace Conference of 1919 // The Western Political Quarterly. — 1962. — December (vol. 15, iss. 4). — P. 773–774. — DOI:10.2307/445584.
 Edward H. Buehrig. Seth P. Tilman: Anglo-American Relations at the Paris Peace Conference of 1919 // The Mississippi Valley Historical Review. — 1962. — March (vol. 48, iss. 4). — P. 730. — ISSN 0161-391X. — DOI:10.2307/1893183.
 D. W. Brogan. Review of Anglo-American Relations at the Paris Peace Conference of 1919 // The English Historical Review. — 1964. — January (vol. 79, iss. 310). — P. 218.
 D. C. Watt. Review of Anglo-American relations at the Paris Peace Conference of 1919 // History. — 1963. — Vol. 48, iss. 163. — P. 243–244.

External links 
 

1961 non-fiction books
English-language books
History books about World War I
Princeton University Press books